Champotón Municipality is a municipality within the state of Campeche, including the city of Champotón and the surrounding area.  In 2010 the municipality of Champotón had a population of 83,021 inhabitants. It has an areal extent of 6,088.28 km² (2,350.7 sq mi) and includes the significant community of Seybaplaya.

The municipality also includes the offshore Cayos Arcas, about 140 km northwest of Campeche and 150 km north of the mainland coast of Champotón.

Demographics
As of 2010, the municipality had a total population of 83,021.

As of 2010, the city of Champotón had a population of 30,881. Other than the city of Champotón, the municipality had 864 localities, the largest of which (with 2010 populations in parentheses) were: Seybaplaya (8,711), Villa Madero (3,954), Santo Domingo Kesté (3,763), Carrillo Puerto (2,829), Sihochac (2,731), Ley Federal de Reforma Agraria (2,435), classified as urban, and Xbacab (1,649), San Pablo Pixtún (1,498), Maya Tecún I (1,254), Hool (1,181), and La Joya (1,007), classified as rural.

References

External links
Municipio de Champotón Official website

Municipalities of Campeche